Conocotocko  ("Standing Turkey"), also known by the folk-etymologized name Cunne Shote, was First Beloved Man of the Cherokee from 1760. He succeeded his uncle Conocotocko I (or "Old Hop") upon the latter's death. Pro-French like his uncle, he steered the Cherokee into war with the British colonies of South Carolina, North Carolina, and Virginia in the aftermath of the execution of several Cherokee leaders who were being held hostage at Fort Prince George. He held his title until the end of the Anglo-Cherokee War in 1761, when he was deposed in favor of Attakullakulla.

Standing Turkey was one of three Cherokee leaders to go with Henry Timberlake to London in 1762-1763, the others being Ostenaco and Pouting Pigeon.

In 1782, he was one of a party of Cherokee which joined the Delaware, Shawnee, and Chickasaw in a diplomatic visit to the Spanish at Fort St. Louis in seeking a new avenue of obtaining arms and other assistance in the prosecution of their ongoing conflict with the Americans in the Ohio Valley. The group of Cherokee led by Standing Turkey sought and received permission to settle in Spanish Louisiana, in the region of the White River.

Notes

References

Bibliography

See also
Anglo-Cherokee War

18th-century Cherokee people
18th-century Native Americans
Native American leaders
People of pre-statehood Tennessee
Year of birth unknown
Year of death unknown